Anestis is a Greek surname. Notable people with the surname include:

Giannis Anestis (born 1991), Greek footballer
Michael Anestis (born 1979), American psychologist and professor

Greek-language surnames